KYAC (90.1 MHz) is a community radio station in Mill City, Oregon. It is owned and operated by Santiam Hearts to Arts.

The station had previously operated as a LPFM radio station at 94.9 MHz. Its owners surrendered KYAC-LP's license to the Federal Communications Commission on February 16, 2022. Licensees are not allowed to hold an interest in both full-power and low-power stations at the same time. The FCC canceled KYAC-LP's license on February 20.

References

External links
 

Linn County, Oregon
YAC
Radio stations established in 2014
2014 establishments in Oregon